The 1977 CFL season is considered to be the 24th season in modern-day Canadian football, although it is officially the 20th Canadian Football League season.

CFL News in 1977
The 65th Grey Cup game, nicknamed "The Ice Bowl", was held in Olympic Stadium in Montreal. The game itself set an attendance record with 68,318, which in turn set a record for ticket revenue of $1,401,930.

The Montreal Alouettes also set an CFL regular-season team attendance record with 69,093 attending the September 6 game against the Toronto Argonauts at Olympic Stadium.

Regular season standings

Final regular season standings
Note: GP = Games Played, W = Wins, L = Losses, T = Ties, PF = Points For, PA = Points Against, Pts = Points

Bold text means that they have clinched the playoffs.
Edmonton and Montreal have first round byes.

Grey Cup playoffs

The Montreal Alouettes are the 1977 Grey Cup champions, defeating the Edmonton Eskimos, 41–6, in front of their home crowd at Montreal's Olympic Stadium.  This Grey Cup was known as the "Ice Bowl" since the field was frozen in a sheet of ice. There was controversy with respect to the game due to the fact the Eskimos were wearing normal cleats, while the Alouettes were wearing staples on their cleats giving them a huge advantage on the icy field. The Alouettes' Sonny Wade (QB) was named the Grey Cup's Most Valuable Player on Offence and Glen Weir (DT) was named the Grey Cup's Most Valuable Player on Defence. The Alouettes' Don Sweet (K) was named Grey Cup's Most Valuable Canadian.

Playoff bracket

CFL Leaders
 CFL Passing Leaders
 CFL Rushing Leaders
 CFL Receiving Leaders

1977 CFL All-Stars

Offence
QB – Jerry Tagge, BC Lions
RB – Jimmy Edwards, Hamilton Tiger-Cats
RB – Jim Washington, Winnipeg Blue Bombers
SB – Tom Scott, Winnipeg Blue Bombers
TE – Tony Gabriel, Ottawa Rough Riders
WR – Tom Forzani, Calgary Stampeders
WR – Leon Bright, BC Lions
C –  Al Wilson, BC Lions
OG – Jeff Turcotte, Ottawa Rough Riders
OG – Ralph Galloway, Saskatchewan Roughriders
OT – Mike Wilson, Toronto Argonauts
OT – Dan Yochum, Montreal Alouettes

Defence
DT – Glen Weir, Montreal Alouettes
DT – Dave Fennell, Edmonton Eskimos
DE – Jim Corrigall, Toronto Argonauts
DE – Ron Estay, Edmonton Eskimos
LB – Danny Kepley, Edmonton Eskimos
LB – Mike Widger, Ottawa Rough Riders
LB – Chuck Zapiec, Montreal Alouettes
DB – Dickie Harris, Montreal Alouettes
DB – Larry Highbaugh, Edmonton Eskimos
DB – Paul Bennett, Toronto Argonauts
DB – Pete Lavorato, Edmonton Eskimos
DB – Randy Rhino, Montreal Alouettes

Special teams
P – Ken Clark, Hamilton Tiger-Cats
K – Dave Cutler, Edmonton Eskimos

1977 Eastern All-Stars

Offence
QB – Tom Clements, Ottawa Rough Riders
RB – Jimmy Edwards, Hamilton Tiger-Cats
RB – Richard Holmes, Toronto & Ottawa
SB – Peter Dalla Riva, Montreal Alouettes
TE – Tony Gabriel, Ottawa Rough Riders
WR – Jeff Avery, Ottawa Rough Riders
WR – Brock Aynsley, Montreal Alouettes
C –  Donn Smith, Ottawa Rough Riders
OG – Jeff Turcotte, Ottawa Rough Riders
OG – Larry Butler, Hamilton Tiger-Cats
OT – Mike Wilson, Toronto Argonauts
OT – Dan Yochum, Montreal Alouettes

Defence
DT – Glen Weir, Montreal Alouettes
DT – Ecomet Burley, Toronto Argonauts
DE – Jim Corrigall, Toronto Argonauts
DE – Jim Piaskoski, Ottawa Rough Riders
LB – Ray Nettles, Toronto Argonauts
LB – Mike Widger, Ottawa Rough Riders
LB – Chuck Zapiec, Montreal Alouettes
DB – Dickie Harris, Montreal Alouettes
DB – Eric Harris, Toronto Argonauts
DB – Paul Bennett, Toronto Argonauts
DB – Tony Proudfoot, Montreal Alouettes
DB – Randy Rhino, Montreal Alouettes

Special teams
P – Ken Clark, Hamilton Tiger-Cats
K – Don Sweet, Montreal Alouettes

1977 Western All-Stars

Offence
QB – Jerry Tagge, BC Lions
RB – Willie Burden, Calgary Stampeders
RB – Jim Washington, Winnipeg Blue Bombers
SB – Tom Scott, Winnipeg Blue Bombers
TE – Gord Paterson, Winnipeg Blue Bombers
WR – Tom Forzani, Calgary Stampeders
WR – Leon Bright, BC Lions
C –  Al Wilson, BC Lions
OG – Buddy Brown, Winnipeg Blue Bombers
OG – Ralph Galloway, Saskatchewan Roughriders
OT – Layne McDowell, BC Lions
OT – Charlie Turner, Edmonton Eskimos

Defence
DT – Frank Landy, BC Lions
DT – Dave Fennell, Edmonton Eskimos
DE – David Boone, Edmonton Eskimos
DE – Ron Estay, Edmonton Eskimos
LB – Danny Kepley, Edmonton Eskimos
LB – Roger Goree, Saskatchewan Roughriders
LB – Glen Jackson, BC Lions
DB – Paul Williams, Saskatchewan Roughriders
DB – Larry Highbaugh, Edmonton Eskimos
DB – Rocky Long, BC Lions
DB – Pete Lavorato, Edmonton Eskimos
DB – Joe Fourqurean, BC Lions
S – Grady Cavness, BC Lions

Special teams
P – Lui Passaglia, BC Lions
K – Dave Cutler, Edmonton Eskimos

1977 CFL Awards
CFL's Most Outstanding Player Award – Jimmy Edwards (RB), Hamilton Tiger-Cats
CFL's Most Outstanding Canadian Award – Tony Gabriel (TE), Ottawa Rough Riders
CFL's Most Outstanding Defensive Player Award – Danny Kepley (LB), Edmonton Eskimos
CFL's Most Outstanding Offensive Lineman Award – Al Wilson (C), BC Lions
CFL's Most Outstanding Rookie Award – Leon Bright (WR),BC Lions
CFLPA's Outstanding Community Service Award – Ron Lancaster (QB), Saskatchewan Roughriders
CFL's Coach of the Year – Vic Rapp, BC Lions

References 

CFL
Canadian Football League seasons